Foxe may refer to:

People
 Charles Foxe (1516–1590), English politician
 Cyrinda Foxe (1952–2002), American actress
 Earle Foxe (1891–1973), American actor
 Edmund Foxe (by 1515 – 1550), English politician
 Edward Foxe (c. 1496 – 1538), English churchman
 Fanne Foxe (1936–2021), Argentine-American stripper
 Hayden Foxe (born 1977), Australian footballer
 John Foxe (1517–1587), English historian and martyrologist
 Foxe's Book of Martyrs, his major work
 John Foxe (MP) (died 1586), English politician
 John Foxe (neuroscientist) (born 1967), Irish neuroscientist
 Kevin Foxe (fl. from 1982), American director and producer
 Luke Foxe (1586–1635), Arctic explorer
 Richard Foxe (c. 1448–1528), English churchman
 Samuel Foxe (1560–1630), English diarist and politician
 Tom Foxe (1937–2000), Irish politician
 William Foxe (1479/80 – 1554), English politician

Other uses
 Foxe Channel, an area of sea in Nunavut, Canada
 Foxe Basin, in Hudson Bay, Nunavut, Canada
 Foxe Peninsula, in Nunavut, Canada
 Fans of X-Rated Entertainment (FOXE), an American pornography fan organization 
 Luke Fox (character), in DC Comics

See also

 Fox (disambiguation)
 Fox (surname)